Echo Dam is a dam in Summit County, Utah, standing about  north of Coalville and creating Echo Reservoir.

The earthen dam was constructed in 1931 by the United States Bureau of Reclamation. Other Weber Basin projects of the Bureau include the upstream Rockport Reservoir. Echo Dam is owned by the Bureau and operated by the local Weber River Water Users Association. In July 2012, crews began a $50 million seismic retrofit project on the dam to address potentially unstable subsoil conditions.

As a recreation area the reservoir offers fishing, boating, camping, and hiking.

External links
 Weber River Water Users Association

References 

Dams in Utah
Reservoirs in Utah
United States Bureau of Reclamation dams
Buildings and structures in Summit County, Utah
Dams completed in 1931
Lakes of Summit County, Utah
1931 establishments in Utah